Dennis Michael Ruprecht, Jr. is a former New Hampshire politician who was a member of the New Hampshire House of Representatives from December 5, 2018 to December 17, 2021.

Early life and education
Ruprecht was born on May 15, 1999 in Littleton, New Hampshire, and grew up in Bath, New Hampshire. He graduated from Woodsville High School in 2017, and that same year was chosen for the United States Senate Youth Program. After graduating from Woodsville High School, Ruprecht attended the University of New Hampshire, Durham where he was a member of Phi Mu Delta. Ruprecht then briefly attended Saint Michael's College before transferring to Plymouth State University where he graduated summa cum laude with a Bachelor of Arts in political science in 2021.

N.H. House of Representatives

Electoral history
Ruprecht first ran for election to the New Hampshire House of Representatives to represent the Grafton 15th district in 2018. He won in the general election on November 6, 2018, with 54.8% of the vote. Ruprecht was first elected at the age of 19, and was the youngest currently-serving member of the House at the time that he was sworn in.

In 2020, Ruprecht was re-elected to the New Hampshire House of Representatives to represent the Grafton 3rd district on November 3, receiving 53.4% of the vote.

Tenure
Ruprecht served in the New Hampshire House of Representatives from December 5, 2018 until stepping down on December 17, 2021. Ruprecht resigned due to having moved out of his district to Vermont.

Ruprecht was a member of the House Committee on Fish and Game and Marine Resources.

National politics
Ruprecht was an early supporter of Joe Biden during the 2020 Democratic Party presidential primaries having endorsed him in July 2019, months ahead of the New Hampshire presidential primary. Ruprecht was selected as one of seventeen speakers to jointly deliver the keynote address at the 2020 Democratic National Convention.

References

21st-century American politicians
Living people
Democratic Party members of the New Hampshire House of Representatives
Plymouth State University alumni
1999 births